"Off the Wall" is a 1953 blues instrumental and single by Little Walter. The single followed "Tell Me Mama", which had reached #10 on the R&B charts, reaching #8. Following Little Walter's recording Big Walter Horton claimed to be the composer, and he recorded the same harmonica-led tune in Memphis on 28 May 1953 for Sun Records.

References

1953 songs
Little Walter songs
1953 singles
Checker Records singles